Neil Bryant is an American politician and attorney who served as a member of the Oregon State Senate from 1992 to 2000. A member of the Republican Party, Bryant represented Oregon's 27th Senate district.

Background 
Bryant was raised in Salem, Oregon. He earned a Bachelor of Arts degree from Pacific Lutheran University and a Juris Doctor from the Willamette University College of Law. As an undergraduate, Bryant played on the football team. While at Pacific Lutheran, Bryant met his wife, Mary (née Arnstad). They married in 1969.

After graduating from law school, Bryant worked as an attorney in Bend, Oregon at a law firm founded by Jay H. Upton. Bryant was elected to the Oregon State Senate in 1992. Since leaving office, Bryant has worked as an attorney and partner at Bryant, Lovlien & Jarvis, PC.

Bryant also served on the Oregon Higher Education Coordinating Commission.

References 

Living people
Oregon lawyers
Republican Party Oregon state senators
Pacific Lutheran University alumni
Willamette University College of Law alumni
People from Salem, Oregon
Lawyers from Salem, Oregon
Year of birth missing (living people)